Peru competed at the 1996 Summer Olympics in Atlanta, United States.

Results by event

Athletics
Men's 100 metres
 Javier Verne

Men's Marathon
 Miguel Mallqui — 2:25.56 (→ 71st place)

Men's 110m Hurdles
 José Riesco

Men's High Jump
 Hugo Muñoz

Women's Marathon
 Marilú Salazar — 2:48.58 (→ 54th place)

Badminton
Men's singles
Mario Carulla

Boxing
Men's Light Flyweight (– 48 kg)
Alberto Rossel
 First Round — Lost to Yang Xiangzhong (China) on points (7-16)

Shooting
Men's Trap
Francisco Boza

Men's Double Trap
Francisco Boza

Men's Skeet
Esteban Boza  
Juan Giha

Swimming
Men's 100 metres Breaststroke
Jorge Arias

Women's 200 metres Freestyle
Maritza Chiaway

Women's 400 metres Freestyle
Maritza Chiaway

Women's 800 metres Freestyle
Maritza Chiaway

Table Tennis
Women's singles
Eliana González

Women's doubles
Eliana González and Milagritos Gorriti

Volleyball

Women's Indoor Team Competition
Preliminary round (group B)
 Lost to Brazil (0-3)
 Lost to Germany (0-3)
 Lost to Cuba (0-3)
 Lost to Russia (0-3)
 Lost to Canada (2-3)
Quarterfinals
 did not advance (→ Eleventh place)
Team roster
Luren Baylon 
Milagros Camere 
Leyla Chihuán 
Milagros Contreras 
Yolanda Delgado 
Iris Falcón 
Sara Joya 
Sandra Rodríguez 
Milagros Moy 
Paola Ramos 
Marjorie Vilchez 
Yulissa Zamudio
Head coach: Park Jong-Dug

Wrestling
Men's Light-Flyweight (Greco-Roman)
Jorge Yllescas

Men's Flyweight (Greco-Roman)
Joël Basaldua

Men's Middleweight (Greco-Roman)
Félix Isisola

Men's Light-Heavyweight (Greco-Roman)
Lucio Vásquez

Men's Featherweight (Freestyle)
Enrique Cubas

See also
Peru at the 1995 Pan American Games

References
sports-reference

Nations at the 1996 Summer Olympics
1996 Summer Olympics
Summer Olympics